Stephen Omony (born 3 November 1981) though some sources mention March 23, 1980, is an Ugandan professional basketball player. He currently plays for the City Oilers of Uganda’s National Basketball League (NBL).

Born in the Namuwongo neighbourhood in Kampala, Omony has played for several teams in the Ugandan top level. In 2017, he signed with the City Oilers for four years.

He has been the team captain of Uganda's national basketball team.

References

External links
 2017 AfroBasket profile
 2017 FIBA Africa Club Champions Cup profile
 Eurobasket.com profile
 RealGM profile
 FIBA Archive profile

1981 births
Living people
Small forwards
Sportspeople from Kampala
Ugandan men's basketball players
City Oilers players